Samuel Alexander Boyle Jr. (November 28, 1876 – October 30, 1923) was an American football player and coach.  He served as the head football coach at the Virginia Military Institute (1898–1899), Pennsylvania State University (1899), and Dickinson College (1900), compiling a career college football record of 14–12–1.

Playing career
Boyle played end for the University of Pennsylvania and was declared a first-team All-American in 1897.

Coaching career

Penn State
Boyle was the head coach at Pennsylvania State University in 1899.  His record at Penn State was 4–6–1.  His squad was outscored 104 to 176 that season.

Dickinson
After one year at Penn State, Boyle became the second head football coach (or at least, the second coach on record) for the Dickinson College Red Devils in Carlisle, Pennsylvania and he held that position for the 1900 season.   His overall coaching record at Dickinson was 5 wins, 4 losses, and 0 ties.  This ranks him 20th at Dickinson in terms of total wins and eighth at Dickinson in terms of winning percentage.

In his one year as head coach, Boyle oversaw the largest defeat in college football history when Dickinson College defeated Haverford Grammar School 227 to 0 (it was common for college teams to play other organized teams outside of the collegiate ranks at the time).

Other athletic work
Boyle continued to work around sports as an athletic official. He also worked as a player-coach for the Pittsburgh Athletic Club.

Death
Boyle died on October 30, 1923,  at his home in Rydal, Pennsylvania, after suffering from tuberculosis for more than five years.

Head coaching record

References

External links
 

1876 births
1923 deaths
19th-century players of American football
American football ends
Player-coaches
Dickinson Red Devils football coaches
Penn Quakers football players
Penn State Nittany Lions football coaches
VMI Keydets football coaches
Sportspeople from Memphis, Tennessee
Players of American football from Memphis, Tennessee
20th-century deaths from tuberculosis
Tuberculosis deaths in Pennsylvania